The men's 50 metre rifle prone competition at the 2004 Summer Olympics was held on August 20 at the Markópoulo Olympic Shooting Centre near Athens, Greece.

The event consisted of two rounds: a qualifier and a final. In the qualifier, each shooter fired 60 shots with a .22 Long Rifle at 50 metres distance from the prone position. Scores for each shot were in increments of 1, with a maximum score of 10.

The top 8 shooters in the qualifying round moved on to the final round. There, they fired an additional 10 shots. These shots scored in increments of .1, with a maximum score of 10.9. The total score from all 70 shots was used to determine final ranking.

23-year-old U.S. shooter Matthew Emmons maintained a single-point lead from the rest of the field in the qualifying round to finish with 703.3 for the rifle prone gold and his first Olympic medal. Germany's Christian Lusch, who had gradually come close on Emmons in an attempt to steal his lead with only two rounds left, ended up taking the silver at 702.2. Meanwhile, Belarus' Sergei Martynov, who had the highest score in the final, shot 105.6 to vault himself from fifth at the start to a bronze-medal position with a total of 701.6, repeating his feat from Sydney 2000.

Sweden's Jonas Edman missed his Olympic title defense after finishing in a distant thirty-second from the prelims with 590 points, while 2000 silver medalist Torben Grimmel also fell short of the finale by just a single point from the cutoff score of 595, relegating to a ninth-place draw with six other shooters.

Records
Prior to this competition, the existing world and Olympic records were as follows.

Qualification round

Final

References

External links
Official Results

Men's 50 m Rifle Prone
Men's 050m prone 2004
Men's events at the 2004 Summer Olympics